Peter Howard Gilmore (born May 24, 1958) is an American writer. He is the current High Priest of the Church of Satan. As a representative of the Church of Satan, Gilmore has been interviewed on numerous television and radio programs dealing with the topic of Satanism, including appearances on History, the BBC, Syfy, Point of Inquiry, and Bob Larson's Christian radio show.

Biography
Gilmore was raised in upstate New York. He visited New York City regularly throughout his youth and moved to Hell's Kitchen in 1980. He read The Satanic Bible at age thirteen and has described The Church of Satan as "the motivating philosophical force in my life" ever since.

He and his wife Peggy Nadramia published a Satanic journal, The Black Flame, from 1989 to 2005. In 2005, Gilmore wrote the new introduction to Anton LaVey's The Satanic Bible, and his essay on Satanism was published in The Encyclopedia of Religion and Nature.

The Satanic Scriptures
A hard cover edition of The Satanic Scriptures, a collection essays and other writings by Gilmore was released on Walpurgis Night 2007, with a subsequent paperback edition released on October 13, 2007. The book includes rituals that were previously not public, such as marriages and Satanic burials.

References

Citations

Works cited

Further reading

Interviews
 Alas, Babylon, article on the gentrification of New York City by Jim Knipfel in New York Press
 Halloween special (4:46-8:14) (October 29, 2010), video interview with George Stroumboulopoulos on George Stroumboulopoulos Tonight (CBC Television)
 Science and Satanism (August 10, 2007), audio interview on Point of Inquiry

External links
 
 

1958 births
Living people
American LaVeyan Satanists
American essayists
American occult writers
American religious writers
Satanist religious leaders